Oxysoma is a genus of South American anyphaenid sac spiders first described by H. Nicolet in 1849.

Species
 it contains eight species:
Oxysoma chiloensis (Ramírez, 2003) – Chile, Argentina
Oxysoma itambezinho Ramírez, 2003 – Brazil
Oxysoma kuni Aisen & Ramírez, 2015 – Chile
Oxysoma longiventre (Nicolet, 1849) – Chile, Argentina
Oxysoma losruiles Aisen & Ramírez, 2015 – Chile
Oxysoma macrocuspis Aisen & Ramírez, 2015 – Chile
Oxysoma punctatum Nicolet, 1849 – Chile, Argentina
Oxysoma saccatum (Tullgren, 1902) – Chile, Argentina

References

Anyphaenidae
Araneomorphae genera
Spiders of South America